Thomas Wedge may refer to:

Thomas Wedge of Chester (1760–1854), agriculturalist
Thomas Wedge (rugby union) (1881–1964), British rugby union player